Ayeyarwady Region Government is the cabinet of Ayeyarwady Region. The cabinet is led by chief minister, Tin Maung Win.

Cabinet (April 2016–present)

Cabinet (2021- present) 
This cabinet is the cabinet appointed by the State Administration Council.

References

State and region governments of Myanmar
Ayeyarwady Region

External links